Ali Tarek (born 20 September 1978) is an Egyptian fencer. He competed in the team foil event at the 2004 Summer Olympics.

References

External links
 

1978 births
Living people
Egyptian male foil fencers
Olympic fencers of Egypt
Fencers at the 2004 Summer Olympics